A by-election for the constituency of Sowerby in the United Kingdom House of Commons was held on 16 March 1949, caused by the resignation of the incumbent Labour MP John Belcher. The result was a hold for the Labour Party, with their candidate Douglas Houghton.

Result

Previous election

References

 Craig, F. W. S. (1983) [1969]. British parliamentary election results 1918-1949 (3rd edition ed.). Chichester: Parliamentary Research Services. . 
 

Sowerby by-election
Sowerby by-election
Sowerby by-election
Sowerby by-election, 1949
By-elections to the Parliament of the United Kingdom in West Yorkshire constituencies
Sowerby by-election, 1949